Franz Eckstein (2 April 1878 – February 1945) was a German screenwriter and film director of the silent era. He made a number of films for the National Film company during the 1920s. He was married to the actress Rosa Porten, sister of Henny Porten.

Selected filmography
 The Newest Star of Variety (1917)
 The Coquette (1917)
 Film Kathi (1918)
 Not of the Woman Born (1918)
 Lotte Lore (1921)
 Your Brother's Wife (1921)
 You Are the Life (1921)
 Your Bad Reputation (1922)
 Maud Rockefeller's Bet (1924)
 Battle of the Butterflies (1924)
 Hedda Gabler (1925)
 The Girl from Abroad (1927)

References

Bibliography
 Reimer, Robert C. & Reimer, Carol J. The A to Z of German Cinema. Scarecrow Press, 2010.

External links

1878 births
1945 deaths
Film people from Leipzig